The Robert Thomson Building is a 9-storey low-rise office building in Hamilton, Ontario, Canada. The building was completed in 1977, and is part of the Lloyd D. Jackson Square complex. The building is still officially known as the Robert Thomson Building, but some signage refers to the building by its address, 110 King Street West.

Description
The building's facade consists of glass windows and a concrete base. The interior features a lobby with granite floors and concrete walls, a digital directory, and an elevator bank. The elevator bank features 3 modernized Otis elevators that serve floors 2 through 7, as well as the plaza level, with one of the elevators serving the underground parking lot, as well as the mechanical floor. The building also features escalators and stairs that lead from the main level (lobby and mall) to the plaza level. The plaza level of the Robert Thomson building extends farther north than floors 2 to 7, and is located above the centre portion of the Jackson Square mall. The building features column-free floor plates.  The Jackson Square mall, as well as the 3 other office buildings in the complex are accessible from the lobby level. The building features a large common underground parking lot with a capacity of 1300 vehicles.

Images

See also
Lloyd D. Jackson Square
100 King Street West
1 James Street North
120 King Street West

References

Buildings and structures in Hamilton, Ontario
Modernist architecture in Canada
Office buildings completed in 1977